The Silver Mask is a 1985 Romanian action historical film directed by Gheorghe Vitanidis. This is the fourth film in the Margelatu series, after Drumul oaselor (1980), Trandafirul galben (1982), Misterele Bucureștilor (1983), followed by Colierul de turcoaze (1986) and Totul se plătește (1987).

Cast
 Florin Piersic — Mărgelatu
 Marga Barbu — Agatha Slătineanu
 Alexandru Repan — Serge Troianoff
 Szabolcs Cseh — Buză de Iepure (as Sobi Ceh)
 Ion Besoiu — domnitorul Gheorghe Bibescu
 Ovidiu Iuliu Moldovan — Aristide / „Masca de argint”
 Traian Stănescu — aga Villara
 George Motoi — lt. Deivos
 Jean Constantin — „profesorul” Aurică
 Marin Moraru — boierul Teodosie Vâlcu
 Vasile Nițulescu — boierul Hargot
 Mihai Mereuță — țăranul Oseacă care aduce carul cu fân
 Constantin Codrescu — Ion Heliade-Rădulescu
 Gheorghe Nuțescu — Turkish diplomatic agent Fuad
 Coca Andronescu — Maria, the cook of the boyar Vâlcu
 Olga Delia Mateescu — Aspasia Șuțu, sisther of Agatha
 Anna Széles — gypsy woman
 Constantin Guriță — the conservative boyar Vardala
 Radu Dunăreanu — poet Cezar Bolliac
 Emil Coșeru
 Dumitru Lazăr — vizitiul surdo-mut Casapu
 Mihai Verbițchi
 Boris Petrof — crâșmarul care-l servește pe Mărgelatu
 Mihai Perșa — slujbaș al Agiei
 Mihai Marta
 Val Lefescu
 Monica Roman
 George Alexandru — epilepticul
 Miron Murea
 Ionel Rusu
 George Menelas
 Aurel Popescu

See also
 List of Romanian historical films
 List of feature film series with six entries

References

External links
 

1985 films
1985 drama films
1980s Romanian-language films
Films directed by Gheorghe Vitanidis
Romanian historical films